James Warren White  (born 2 May 1962) is an English professional snooker player who has won three seniors World titles. Nicknamed "The Whirlwind" because of his fluid, attacking style of play, White is the 1980 World Amateur Champion, 2009 Six-red World champion, a three-time World Seniors Champion (2010, 2019, 2020), 2019 Seniors 6-Red World Champion and 1984 World Doubles champion with Alex Higgins.

White has won two of snooker's three majors: the UK Championship (in 1992) and the Masters (in 1984) and a total of ten ranking events. He is currently tenth on the all-time list of ranking event winners. He reached six World Championship finals but never won the event; the closest he came was in 1994 when he lost in a final-frame decider against Stephen Hendry. He spent 21 seasons ranked in snooker's elite top 16. In team events, he won the Nations Cup and the World Cup with England. He is one of a select number of players to have made over 300 century breaks in professional competition. White was also the first left-handed player, and the second player overall, to record a maximum break at the World Championship.

Early life
White was born in Streathbourne Road, Tooting, London, England, and studied at Ernest Bevin School. He never achieved academic success, as he was often truant from school from the age of eight or nine, spending more and more time at Ted Zanoncelli's snooker hall. It was around this time that White met Tony Meo, with whom he would compete in money matches in many venues. His natural aptitude for snooker led to a successful amateur career. After winning the English Amateur Championship in 1979, a year later he became the youngest ever winner of the World Amateur Snooker Championship, aged 18, a record since surpassed by Ian Preece and Hossein Vafaei.

Career
With a host of major titles and achievements, including ten ranking tournaments, White's overall record ranks him well up the list of snooker's most successful players. The BBC describes him as a "legend". A left-hander, he reached the World Professional Championship Final on six occasions (1984, 1990–1994) but failed to win the sport's most prestigious title since his first attempt in 1981. Nonetheless, his consistency waned in the 2000s and a first-round defeat in the 2006 World Championship saw White drop out of the world's top 32 player rankings. White's continued slide down the rankings saw him drop to 65th but he recovered slightly to move up to no. 56 for the 2009–10 season. White is one of only seven players to have completed a maximum break at the Crucible Theatre, doing so in the 1992 World Snooker Championship. He has compiled more than 300 century breaks during his career.

1976-1991
White's greatest achievement of his young career was in winning the English Amateur Championships. In the London Section, he beat M Goodchild 4–0, D Asbury 4–3, R Birt 4–0, Tony Meo 4–2 in the semi-finals and Danny Adds 4–1 in the final. This took him to the Southern Area proper where he beat Mark Wildman 4–3, Meirion Williams 4–3, George Eaton 5–3 and Cliff Wilson 8–5 in the final. Dave Martin, who won the Northern Section, was beaten 13–10 in the final itself. He suffered a couple of unexpected losses after this – to Walt Ley in the Westward Ho! Open semi-final, 2–3 and to Dave Gilbert, 2–3, in the London Final of the British Junior (U-19) Championships 1–3 (White made a break of 105 in an earlier round). He came back, however, by retaining the Wandsworth Classic beating Tony O'Beirne, Wally West and Dave Gilbert in the last three rounds and also reaching the final of the Pontins Spring Open (out of 1034 entries), beating Doug Mountjoy 4–1, Neville Suthers 4–1, John Howell 4–0 and Paul Medati 4–1 before losing 3–7 to Steve Davis, despite Davis giving White thirty points start per frame. He was knocked out of the 1st round of the Pontins junior competition by John Carney. In the Lucania Junior Masters, he was beaten on frame countback but showed his class to reach the final of the Warners Open, losing to Tony Meo 2–5, having beaten John Law, John Virgo and Nick Fairall. Steve Davis beat him again, this time 4–0 in the North Ormesby Invitation (after having beaten Willie Thorne 4–0 in the quarter-final) and then lost in the next three tournaments to Dennis Hughes 1–5 (Demmy Manchester Classic), B Jones (Pontins Autumn Open) and Roy Connor. In the Canadian Open, he defeated Tony Knowles 9–5 but lost 3–9 to Steve Davis in the last 16.

1980 opened with him winning the Demmy Pro-Am, defeating Tony Knowles 5–1, Willie Thorne 5–1, Dave Martin 5–1, Alex Higgins 5–3 and Steve Davis in the final 5–2. Davis beat White in the semi-finals of the Invitation tournament at Louth Town & Country Club. Having beaten Thorne, again, 5–3, David pipped White 6–5. White made an unsuccessful defence of his English Amateur title when he lost to Mike Darrington in the semi-finals of the Southern Area, 5–8, having beaten Dave Gilbert 8–5 and Geoff Foulds 8–2. Tony Knowles beat him in an early round of the Pegasus Snooker Club Pro-Am 3–1 and he had to scratch for being late in the London & South Area of the British Junior Championships having earlier beaten Neal Foulds 3–1. Charlie Gay knocked him out of the Westward Ho! tournament 2–0 and in a qualifying round of the Pontins Spring Open, he lost to Maurice Suckling. Defeats to Greg Baxter, in an early round of the Heineken Lager Open and to Joe Johnson in the North Ormesby Invitation preceded a trip to the Canadian Open where he beat Vic Harris 9–8 before losing to Alex Higgins 7–9. He was also beaten by Dave Gilbert, 0–3, in the Lucania Masters.

White established himself as a top professional in 1981. After losing 8–10 to eventual champion Steve Davis in the first round of the 1981 World Championship, White went on to win his first professional title, the Scottish Masters, beating Cliff Thorburn 9–4 in the final. Thorburn led 3–0 and 4–1 but then White won eight frames in succession to win the title and the £8,000 first prize. Later in the year he also won the Northern Ireland Classic (defeating Davis).

The World Championship has provided the theatre for White's greatest disappointments. After missing a red with the rest, however, he could only watch as Higgins compiled a frame-winning 69 break. Higgins won the deciding frame that followed to reach the final.

In 1984 White won the Masters, beating Terry Griffiths 9–5 in the final. He followed this success by reaching his first World Championship final. Trailing Steve Davis 4–12 after the first two sessions, White responded by reducing the deficit to 15–16. He then made an aggressive clearance of 65 to take the score to 16–17, but was unable to build upon a 40-point lead in the following frame, and lost 16–18. White did, however, become a World Doubles Champion later that year when he and Alex Higgins defeated Willie Thorne and Cliff Thorburn 10–2 in the final of the World Doubles Championship.

In 1986 White reached his second Masters final, but was defeated by Cliff Thorburn. However, he won the Classic and also retained the Irish Masters title he won in 1985. White won the Classic when he beat Thorburn in the final frame after needing a snooker. Later in the year, he overcame veteran Rex Williams 10–6 to win his first Grand Prix title.

White's third-ranking win – the 1987 British Open – helped him to end the 1986–87 season as World number 2, behind Steve Davis who defeated him 16–11 in the semi-finals of the 1987 World Championship. Later that year White and Davis contested a memorable 1987 UK Championship final which Davis won 16–14.

In 1988 he defeated John Campbell, Stephen Hendry and Tony Knowles to reach his fourth World Championship semi-final. He played Terry Griffiths and, trailing 11–13, lost a tied frame on a respotted black. Griffiths went on to reach the final courtesy of a 16–11 win. White did at least manage to consolidate his number-2 world ranking. However the 1988–89 season was less successful, and White's ranking slipped. He trailed John Virgo 11–12 in the second round of the 1989 World Championship and looked beaten when his opponent was on a break of 26 in the following frame. Virgo, however, called a foul on himself and White was able to win 13–12. The reprieve was short-lived as White was soundly beaten 7–13 by eventual finalist John Parrott in the quarter-finals. White avenged this defeat later in the year by beating Parrott 18–9 in the final of the invitational World Matchplay.

In 1990, White recorded a 16–14 victory over Steve Davis in the semi-finals of the World Championship. It was Davis's first defeat in the event in four years. White subsequently lost his second World Championship final 12–18 to Stephen Hendry. However, White beat Hendry 18–9 to retain his World Matchplay title later in the year and that win was followed by a 10–4 victory over Hendry (after leading 9–0) in the final of the 1991 Classic.  White continued his run of success with victory in the short-lived World Masters, beating Tony Drago 10–6 in the final.

Steve James ended Hendry's reign as World Champion in the 1991 World Championship and White, in turn, defeated James to reach the final. He played John Parrott and was whitewashed in the first session 0–7.  Although White managed to close the gap to 7–11, Parrott was able to seal an 18–11 victory. Parrott then overcame White 16–13 to win the 1991 UK Championship later in 1991.

1992–2002
White started 1992 positively and picked up his second British Open title, beating Steve Davis in the semi-finals and James Wattana in the final. He won another ranking title, the European Open, shortly after.

White was drawn against Tony Drago in the first round of the 1992 World Championship. After opening up an 8–4 lead, White made history in the 13th frame by becoming only the second player to make a maximum break in the World Championship. He won £100,000 in prize money for this achievement. Close wins over Alain Robidoux and Jim Wych followed before White met Alan McManus in the semi-finals, where he pulled away from 4–4 to win 16–7. He played Stephen Hendry in the final and won each of the first two sessions to open up a 10–6 lead, which he extended to 12–6 and 14–8. From 14–9, White lost three successive frames from commanding positions. At 14–12, White went  when compiling a potentially frame-winning break. Hendry drew level at 14–14 without conceding a further  and won the closely contested 29th and 30th frames to lead 16–14. Two   completed Hendry's ten-frame winning streak and a remarkable 18–14 victory.

White responded well from this significant setback in the early part of the 1992–93 season. He defeated Ken Doherty 10–9 to claim his second 1992 Grand Prix title and followed this with an impressive victory in the 1992 UK Championship. After defeating Alan McManus 9–7 in the semi-finals, White opened up a commanding 6–1 lead in the first session of the final against John Parrott, from where he secured a 16–9 win. White has stated that this was among the best matches he has ever played.

However White toiled for the remainder of the season, and his struggles continued at the 1993 World Championship.  He did, however, manage to overcome Joe Swail, Doug Mountjoy and Dennis Taylor to reach the semi-finals. White lost the first five frames of his semi-final with James Wattana but, from 2–6, he won 12 successive frames en route to a 16–9 victory. However he proved no match for Stephen Hendry in the final, and Hendry's century break in his first visit to the table proved portentous, as White was beaten 18–5 with a session to spare. Only John Parrott (in 1989) has suffered a heavier defeat in a World Championship final. White did, however, manage to end the season on a high note when he beat Alan McManus to win the Matchroom League.

During a 1993 match against Ronnie O’Sullivan, White escaped a snooker by precisely backspinning the cue ball around the blue ball to safely hit the brown. This shot has often been described as “Shot Of The Century”.

White endured a lacklustre campaign in the 1993–94 season, but reached the 1994 World Championship final for a fifth successive year, becoming only the second player after Steve Davis (1983–89) to achieve this. For the fourth time in five years, White's opponent in the final was Stephen Hendry and the defending champion opened up a 5–1 lead. White recovered well to lead 13–12 and made a break of 75 to take the match into a deciding frame. In the final frame, White was on a break of 29 and leading the frame by 37 points to 24 when he missed a straightforward black off its spot. Hendry cleared with a technically straightforward break of 58 to win the title.

White's form continued to decline the following season and he failed to reach a ranking final. However, his results on the table were greatly overshadowed, when he was diagnosed with testicular cancer during the season. He recovered after having his left testicle removed.

At the 1995 World Championship, White was involved in a controversial first-round match against South African Peter Francisco. From 2–2 White was able to pull away and win convincingly by 10 frames to 2. Shortly after it emerged that large sums of money had been placed on White to win the match by the eventual scoreline. The ensuing investigation found Francisco guilty of misconduct and banned him for five years. However no evidence was found against White, and he was cleared of any wrongdoing.

White put this controversy behind him and overcame David Roe and John Parrott to reach his tenth World Championship semi-final. In his match with Stephen Hendry, White could only watch as the defending champion made a 147 break to go 8–4 in front. White recovered well to 7–8 and won three successive frames to reduce his arrears from 9–14 to 12–14. However, Hendry proved too strong and ran out a 16–12 win.

White's ranking slipped from 7th to 13th at the end of the 1995–96 season and he was beaten 13–12 in a second-round encounter with Peter Ebdon in the 1996 World Championship. White endured further personal problems later in 1996 with the deaths of his brother Martin and mother Lil. His mother's death caused him to pull out of the 1996 Mosconi Cup pool competition.

In the 1996–97 season White failed to win a professional match until February and a first-round defeat at the 1997 World Championship against Anthony Hamilton (9–10, after leading 8–4) saw him drop out of the top-16 in the world rankings.

A run to the semi-finals of the 1997 Grand Prix helped to remedy this and White then enjoyed a great form at the 1998 World Championship. After qualifying to play Stephen Hendry in the first round, White opened with a century break and uncharacteristically shrewd matchplay enabled him to open up a 7–0 lead with only one further break over 50. Despite losing the next three frames from winning positions, White was able to seal a memorable 10–4 success and became the first player to beat Hendry twice at the World Championship. White followed this with a 13–3 win over Darren Morgan which included a break of 144. In his quarter-final against Ronnie O'Sullivan, however, White reverted to his more familiar all-out attacking style and lost the first session 1–7. Although he fought back to 6–9, White succumbed to 7–13.

After regaining his top-16 ranking in the 1999–2000 season White started 2000 by reaching the semi-finals of the Welsh Open, where he lost 5–6 to Stephen Lee, despite leading 4–1 at one point of the match. He then defeated Marco Fu and John Higgins to reach the quarter-finals of the Masters, and he followed this up with a run to the quarter-finals of the World Championship. On both occasions, however, he was beaten by Matthew Stevens. Largely due to his poor form in the 1998–99 season, White also lost his top-16 place. He fought back the following season, reaching the final of the 2000 British Open (losing 6–9 to Peter Ebdon) and the semi-finals of the 2000 Grand Prix in the early part of the campaign. His only other victory of note, however, was a 6–2 defeat of Ronnie O'Sullivan in the 2001 Masters and White subsequently failed to qualify for the 2001 World Championship.

Ranked 11 at the start of the 2001–02 season, White performed steadily in the ranking events without reaching a semi-final. In the invitational 2002 Masters he beat Matthew Stevens 6–1 and came back from 2–5 behind to defeat O'Sullivan 6–5 in the quarter-finals. He similarly recovered from 2–5 down in his semi-final with Mark Williams but lost 5–6. He lost 3–13 in his second-round match with Matthew Stevens at the 2002 World Championship and issued an immediate apology after hitting the cue ball off the table in frustration when trailing 2–5.

2003–2009
White won only two ranking event matches in the 2002–03 season but was able to maintain his top-16 ranking. He came back from 1–5 down to defeat World Champion Peter Ebdon 6–5 in their first-round at the 2003 Masters.

In the 2003–04 season White produced his most consistent season in over a decade. After reaching the semi-finals of the 2003 UK Championship in November 2003, White defeated Neil Robertson, Stephen Hendry and Peter Ebdon to reach the semi-finals of the 2004 Masters – where he lost a tight match against Ronnie O'Sullivan. White followed this up with further victories over Hendry and Robertson en route to the final of the European Open in Malta, but was beaten 3–9 by world number 48 Stephen Maguire. His last ranking victory to date came in April 2004, when White defeated Shaun Murphy, John Parrott, Ian McCulloch, Peter Ebdon and Paul Hunter to win the Players Championship in Glasgow – his first ranking title in over 11 years. Victory in the 2004 World Championship could have given White the number-one ranking, but he was beaten 10–8 by qualifier Barry Pinches after leading 4–2.

White's consistency diminished in the 2004–05 season. Although his ranking rose to number 8 he was unable to reach the quarter-finals of any ranking event. However, he made two more memorable comebacks in the 2005 Masters. White trailed Matthew Stevens 2–5 in the first round and pulled back to 4–5 after needing two snookers in the ninth frame. White went on to win 6–5 and beat Stevens's compatriot Mark Williams by the same score in the quarter-finals after trailing 4–5. But White was beaten 6–1 by Ronnie O'Sullivan in the semi-finals.

White fell out of the top-32 at the end of the 2005–06 season and has not regained this status to date. He lost in the first round of the 2006 World Championship, although he did beat Stephen Hendry, Ding Junhui and World Champion Graeme Dott to reach the final of the 2006 Premier League.

In the 2006–07 season he qualified for only one ranking event, the 2007 China Open. He had a walkover of Stephen Lee before he lost 1–5 against John Higgins. After the season, he fell out of the top-48.

In the 2007–08 season he won 7 of his 16 qualifying matches. He won 4 straight matches at the 2007 Grand Prix and finished in the third place of his group, thus not qualifying for the main draw. He won one match at the 2008 Welsh Open and two matches at the 2008 World Championship. After the season, he fell out of the top-64 and remained on the tour only via the one year list.

He began the 2008–09 season by qualifying for the main draw of the 2008 Northern Ireland Trophy and the 2008 Shanghai Masters, but lost in the first round against Barry Hawkins 3–5 and Mark King 4–5 respectively. He won 4 of his next 7 qualifying matches (2 at the 2008 Grand Prix and at the 2008 UK Championship. After this he qualified for the main stage of the 2009 Welsh Open, but lost in the first round 1–5 against Ali Carter. He won his next qualifying match at the 2009 World Championship. In the second qualifying round he defeated Vincent Muldoon 10–8, but lost his next match 8–10 against Andy Hicks. At the end of the season he has the provisional ranking of No. 56.

2009-2016
Provisionally ranked number 47 for the 2009–10 season, White showed a surprising return to form at the start of the season when he reached the final of the Champion of Champions Challenge in Killarney, eventually losing 1–5 to Shaun Murphy. His second tournament of the season was the Sangsom 6-red World Grand Prix in Bangkok, Thailand. He won the tournament, putting an end to his drought of titles by claiming his first since 2004. On his way to the final he defeated Shaun Murphy, defending champion Ricky Walden, Mark King, and Mark Williams, eventually beating Barry Hawkins in the final 8–6. One month later, in the Paul Hunter Classic, White again reached the final but this time he lost to Shaun Murphy 0–4. Two months later, on 18 October, he reached the final of the World Series of Snooker in Prague, his fourth final of the season. This time he was victorious, claiming his second title of the season by defeating Graeme Dott 5–3.

In the Wembley Masters, White played Mark King in the wild card round, but lost the match 2–6. Prior to the World Championship, he won only two of his six qualifying matches: he defeated Bjorn Haneveer 5–0 at the Shanghai Masters and Jordan Brown 5–1 at the Welsh Open. Due to this disappointment, and skipping the 2009 UK Championship for I'm a Celebrity...Get Me out of Here!, he was at risk of losing his Main Tour spot for the following season. However, he secured his place on the Main Tour for another season with a 10–8 victory over Mark Boyle at the World Championship Qualifiers. He then lost 3–10 against Ken Doherty in the next round.

White started the 2010–11 season by entering the Players Tour Championship, his best performance coming in the first European event and at the sixth event in Sheffield, where he reached the quarter-finals each time. After 12 out of 12 events White was ranked 34th in the Order of Merit.

White also reached the quarter-finals of the Six-red World Championship, topping his qualifying group along the way. He failed to qualify for the Shanghai Masters, losing his first qualifying match 3–5 against Liam Highfield. He won his two qualification matches for the World Open; but lost 1–3 against Ronnie O'Sullivan in the last 32.

White won the World Seniors Championship, defeating Steve Davis 4–1 in the final.
At the 2010 UK Championship in December, White lost 8–9 to Stephen Hendry in the first-round, after he had come through three qualifying rounds to get to Telford. It was only the fifth time in 24 years that White and Hendry had taken each other to the final frame and 16 years since Hendry's 18–17 win over White in the 1994 World Championship final. He participated at qualifying stages of the German Masters, but lost in the second round 1–5 against Jimmy Robertson. White reached the last qualifying round of the Welsh Open, but was whitewashed by Ryan Day, and also qualified for the final stages of the China Open, by defeating Liu Chuang, Peter Lines and Dominic Dale, but had to withdraw from the tournament due to visa problems. White lost his first qualifying match for the World Championship 9–10 against Jimmy Robertson.

White began the 2011–12 season ranked number 55. White failed to qualify for the first two ranking events of the season, as he lost 3–5 against Rory McLeod at the Australian Goldfields Open and 0–5 against Nigel Bond at the Shanghai Masters White failed to defend his World Seniors Championship title, as he lost in the semi-finals 0–2 against eventual champion Darren Morgan. White failed to qualify for the next two ranking events, as he lost 5–6 against Jamie Jones at the 2011 UK Championship, and 4–5 against Peter Ebdon at the German Masters. After the FFB Snooker Open White was ranked number 47.

At the 2013 World Seniors Championship, White lost to Stephen Hendry in the quarter-final.

He finished the 2013–14 season ranked world number 64, almost losing his place on the professional World Snooker circuit. While White remained on the tour, however, fellow veteran Steve Davis lost his place, landing outside the top 64.

White started the season with a 2–5 loss to Fraser Patrick in the qualifying round of the Wuxi Classic, and a 4–5 second-round loss to Scott Donaldson in the Australian Goldfields Open. He then reached the last 64 of the next two European Tour Events, losing to Stuart Bingham and Stephen Maguire respectively.

He had a better result in the EPTC Event 3 where he progressed to the last 16 before losing 0–4 to Shaun Murphy, and in the APTC Event 2 where he made it to another last 16 before once again losing 0–4 to Matthew Selt. He also qualified for the International Championship where he lost 4–6 to Barry Hawkins.

White's season ended after an 8–10 defeat to Selt in the second round of qualifying for the 2014 World Championship.

The 2015/16 season ended in disappointment when White lost the deciding frame of his first-round World Championship Qualifier against Gerard Greene.

2016–2022

White made it to the quarter-final of a ranking event at the Paul Hunter Classic in Germany, his first for over ten years. Despite several good performances, he finished outside the top 64 and lost his tour card after 37 years as a professional. World Snooker, however, chose to give White and Ken Doherty a further two-year invitational tour card.

In White's first ranking event of the season, he made it to the last 16 having only made three breaks over 50. He subsequently lost 1–4 to Anthony McGill and then lost 0–5 to Ryan Day in the round of 128 in the China Championship.

White won his first professional title in seven years after winning the UK Seniors Championship as part of the World Seniors Tour. In the quarter-finals, he defeated amateur Les Dodd 3–1 and another amateur Jonathan Bagley by the same scoreline in the semi-finals. He met Ken Doherty in the final and won the match 4–2, thereby winning the first edition of the event. White later played in the qualifiers for the 2018 World Snooker Championship, losing his second-round match to Joe Perry.

In the first Qualifying Round of the 2019 World Snooker Championship, White drew Ross Bulman, an unranked player who had achieved enough success to be selected by the WPBSA for a place in qualifying. White took a 6–3 lead at the end of the first session and won the opening frame of the second session to lead 7–3. Bulman took the following two frames to narrow the gap to 7–5. White won the following three frames in succession to come through the tie a comfortable 10–5 winner to set up a second-round match against Ali Carter. The opening session of White's second qualifying round match with Carter finished 5–4. White was unable to win another frame however in the second session and lost the match 4–10.

Winning the World Seniors Championship in August 2019, White qualified for the 2019 Champion of Champions tournament where he narrowly lost 3–4 to Ronnie O'Sullivan in the first round. White recorded no wins in ranking events until the first round of qualifying for the 2020 European Masters, in which he beat Hammad Miah 5–4 after trailing 3–1 and being 4–3 up. White was beaten in Round Two by Mark Selby. In the 2020 World Seniors Championship, Jimmy White came back to beat Ken Doherty 5–4, after trailing 4–0, to retain his title.

In March 2021, White reached the fourth round of the Gibraltar Open, after defeating 2015 world champion, Stuart Bingham.

In May, at the World Seniors Championship, he reached the final, but failed to defend his title as he lost to David Lilley.

White lost in the semifinals of the 2022 UK Seniors Championship to eventual runner up and reigning seniors champion David Lilley, 4-2.

In May 2022, once again at the World Seniors Championship, White beat Wael Talaat and Rory McLeod, to advance to the semifinals for the fourth year in a row.

Personal life

White has five children. In 2005, as part of a sponsorship deal with HP Sauce, he changed his name by deed poll to "James Brown" for the Masters. In his autobiography, released in November 2014, White revealed that he was addicted to crack cocaine during a three-month spell of his career. He said that he went from taking cocaine to crack following his defeat by Steve Davis in the 1984 World Championship final. White lives in Epsom, Surrey.

In the late 1990s, White's Bull Terrier, Splinter, was dognapped and held for ransom. Splinter became the first dog to have a colour poster on the front page of The Times. White paid the ransom, and Splinter was returned to him. Splinter went on to live for another three years.

White is also a pool and poker player. Along with Steve Davis and Alex Higgins, White was a member of Europe's victorious Mosconi Cup pool team of 1995, and won the deciding match against Lou Butera. He won the second Poker Million tournament, held in 2003, which also had Steve Davis at the final table. He was also good friends with professional poker player, Dave "The Devilfish" Ulliott.

White is currently a commentator for snooker coverage on Eurosport-UK.			

In April 2015, he appeared as a guest at a campaign event when his friend Kim Rose was standing as the UK Independence Party candidate to be MP for Southampton Itchen.

White has been a supporter of Chelsea F.C. since 1972.

In 2018, White began a relationship with beauty queen Jade Slusarczyk, 23 years his junior.

In the media
White had a cameo role as himself (as the World Billiards Champion) in Stephen Chow's 1990 kung fu and billiards comedy film, Legend of the Dragon.

On the BBC game show Big Break, White was the first player to clear the table with 3 reds remaining in the final part of the challenge (thus winning the top prize for the contestant he was playing for). He was introduced to the studio audience on each appearance with the song "Jimmy Jimmy" by the Undertones. White was also the first (and only) winner of the ITV show Tenball, featuring a mix between pool and snooker.

In the film Jack Said (a prequel to Jack Says) White played the part of Vic Lee, a dodgy snooker club owner, in his first major film role for British cinema.

White appeared in the 9th series of I'm a Celebrity...Get Me Out of Here! He finished in third place on 4 December 2009, with Gino D'Acampo the eventual winner.

On September 23, 2019, Jimmy White published an apology to Kirk Stevens on White's official Facebook page stating that in his autobiography "Second Wind" he misremembered a few stories as occurring with Kirk Stevens that in fact did not. These events were widely broadcast in the media and White wanted to make the apology public to prevent them from being repeated. White further stated that he did not intend his words to be interpreted as meaning that Kirk Stevens introduced him to crack cocaine or that Kirk Stevens ever played WPBSA snooker under the influence of drugs.

White has endorsed four computer games: Jimmy White's 'Whirlwind' Snooker, Jimmy White's 2: Cueball, Jimmy White's Cueball World and Pool Paradise. These games have been released for numerous machines, from 8 bits up to second-generation consoles and mobile phones. In June 2007, he was contracted to the online billiard website Play89.

White was portrayed by James Bailey in the BBC film The Rack Pack, which focused on the rivalry between Alex Higgins and Steve Davis in the 1980s

Performance and rankings timeline

Career finals

Ranking finals: 24 (10 titles)

Non-ranking finals: 49 (28 titles)

Pro-am finals: 7 (1 title)

Team finals: 7 (4 titles)

Amateur finals: 5 (4 titles)

References

Further reading

External links

 
Jimmy White at worldsnooker.com
 
 Profile at Global Snooker
 
 

1962 births
Living people
English snooker players
Masters (snooker) champions
English pool players
People from Tooting
People educated at Ernest Bevin College
Members of the Order of the British Empire
UK champions (snooker)
World champions in snooker
I'm a Celebrity...Get Me Out of Here! (British TV series) participants